The 2022 Epson Tour is a series of professional women's golf tournaments held from March through October 2022 in the United States. The Epson Tour is the second-tier women's professional golf tour in the United States and is the "official developmental tour" of the LPGA Tour. It was most recently known as the Symetra Tour.

Schedule and results
The number in parentheses after winners' names show the player's total number of official money, individual event wins on the Epson Tour including that event.

Source:

Leading money winners
The top ten money winners at the end of the season gained fully exempt cards on the LPGA Tour for the 2023 season.

Source:

See also
2022 LPGA Tour
2022 in golf

References

External links

Symetra Tour
Epson Tour